Encyonopsis is a genus of diatoms belonging to the family Cymbellaceae.

Species
 

Species:

Encyonopsis abbottii 
Encyonopsis aequaliformis 
Encyonopsis aequalis

References

Cymbellales
Diatom genera